Odds or Evens is an album by Mike Stern, released in 1991 through Atlantic Records. The album reached a peak position of number eight on Billboard Top Contemporary Jazz Albums chart.

Track listing

Personnel
 Don Alias – percussion
 Jim Beard – piano, synthesizer
 Bob Berg – saxophone
 Dennis Chambers – drums
 Lincoln Goines – bass
 Anthony Jackson – bass
 Ben Perowsky – drums
 Mike Stern – guitar

Other credits
 Ron Bach – digital sequencing
 Thomas Bricker – design
 Kate Broudy – assistant engineer
 Greg Calbi – mastering
 Bob Defrin – art direction
 Mike Krowiak – assistant engineer
 Matt Lane – assistant engineer
 Jeff Lippay – assistant engineer
 Phil Magnotti – engineer, mixing
 Christine Martin – executive producer
 Roxy Rifkin – photography

Chart performance

References

1991 albums
Mike Stern albums
Atlantic Records albums